Emmanuel Boyer de Fonscolombe (1810–1875) was a French aristocrat and composer.

Biography

Early life
Emmanuel Boyer de Fonscolombe was born on October 27, 1810 in Aix-en-Provence. The Boyer de Fonscolombe family became an aristocratic family with his paternal great-great-grandfather Honoré Boyer de Fonscolombe (1683–1743), who served as Secretary to King Louis XV of France (1710–1774). His father was Charles Boyer de Fonscolombe (1778–1838) and his mother, Emilie de Cotto (1790-unknown). He had two brothers, Philippe and Ludovic. Gabriel-Barthélemy de Magneval (1751–1821) was his grandfather.

Career
He was trained as a lawyer, and was an amateur entomologist and botanist.

He became a renowned music composer. He wrote an opera, Un Prisonnier en Crimée. He also composed motets, melodies for Roman Catholic Masses, etc. He served as a chapel master in the Église de la Madeleine in Aix. He was friends with composer Félicien David (1810–1876), who honoured him with two of his songs: "Eden and Moïse au Sinaï.

He was made a hereditary Baron by Emperor Napoleon III (1808–1873) on August 1, 1864.

Personal life

He was married to Anne Salavy, daughter of Jacques-Henri Salavy and granddaughter of politician Jean-Honoré Salavy (1749–1823). They had two sons: 
Charles Henri Boyer de Fonscolombe (1838–1907). He married Alice de Romanet de Lestrange (1847–1933), daughter of Théodore de Romanet de Lestrange (1823–1900) and Caroline de Lestrange (1824–1905). They had a son and a daughter:
Emmanuel Boyer de Fonscolombe de la Môle (1874-unknown). He married Yvonne Gavoty (1883–1965), daughter of Charles Gavoty (1843–1930) and Delphine Jacques (1856–1928). They had a daughter and a son:
Sabine Boyer (1910–2004). She married Bernard Guillaume de Sauville de la Presle (1907–2008).
Charles Boyer de Fonscolombe de la Môle (born 1912).
Marie Boyer de Fonscolombe de la Môle (1875–1972). She married Jean Marc Martin de Saint-Exupéry (1863–1904), the son of Jean Louis Fernand de Saint-Exupéry (1833–1919) and Alix Elisabeth Blouquier de Trélan (1843–1906). They had five children:
Magdeleine de Saint-Exupéry (1897–1926).
Simone de Saint-Exupéry (1898–1978).
Antoine de Saint-Exupéry (1900–1944). He was an aviator and the author of The Little Prince.
François de Saint-Exupéry (1902–1917).
Gabrielle de Saint-Exupéry (1903–1986).
Fernand Hippolyte Boyer de Fonscolombe (1841-unknown).

He resided with his family in the Château de La Môle, a castle in La Môle belonging to the Boyer de Fonscolombe family since 1770. They also lived in a family hôtel particulier in Aix-en-Provence: the Hôtel Boyer de Fonscolombe, now listed as a monument historique, located at 21 rue Gaston de Saporta.

He died in 1875 in Aix-en-Provence.

References

1810 births
1875 deaths
People from Aix-en-Provence
People from Var (department)
French male composers
19th-century French composers
19th-century French male musicians